Tang Hua (born 6 September 1977) is a Chinese former archer. He competed at the 1996 Summer Olympics and the 2000 Summer Olympics.

References

External links
 

1977 births
Living people
Chinese male archers
Olympic archers of China
Archers at the 1996 Summer Olympics
Archers at the 2000 Summer Olympics
Place of birth missing (living people)
Archers at the 1998 Asian Games
Asian Games medalists in archery
Asian Games bronze medalists for China
Medalists at the 1998 Asian Games